London After Midnight (original working title:  The Hypnotist) is a lost 1927 American silent mystery horror film directed and co-produced by Tod Browning and starring Lon Chaney, with Marceline Day, Conrad Nagel, Henry B. Walthall and Polly Moran. The film was distributed by Metro-Goldwyn-Mayer, and was written by Waldemar Young, based on the story "The Hypnotist" which was written by Browning. Merritt B. Gerstad was the cinematographer, and the sets were designed by Cedric Gibbons and Arnold Gillespie. Harry Sharrock was the assistant director. The film cost $151,666.14 to produce, and grossed $1,004,000. Chaney's real-life make-up case can be seen in the last scene of the film sitting on a table, the only time it ever appeared in a movie. Browning remade the film as a talkie in 1935, as Mark of the Vampire, starring Bela Lugosi.

The last known copy of the film was destroyed in the 1965 MGM vault fire, along with hundreds of other rare early films, making it one of the most sought-after lost silent films. Film historians William K. Everson and David Bradley claim they saw the film in the early 1950s, and an MGM vault inventory from 1955 shows the print being stored in Vault #7.

Historian Jon C. Mirsalis commented, "Despite all the mythology and excitement over the film, all indications are that it would be a disappointment if uncovered today. Both Everson and Bradley admit that the film was inferior to Mark of the Vampire. The critics of the time were likewise lukewarm, and even Chaney's performance got less than the usual enthusiastic reviews. The eerie sets, and Chaney's stunning vampire make-up, make for intriguing still photographs, but these scenes account for only a small portion of the film, the rest of the footage being devoted to Polly Moran's comic relief, and talkie passages between detective Chaney and Walthall. Perhaps it is a film that is viewed with more reverence than it deserves simply because it is no longer available for study."

In 2002, Turner Classic Movies aired a reconstructed version, produced by Rick Schmidlin, using the original script and numerous film stills to recreate the original plot.

Plot
Roger Balfour is found dead in his London home one night. Burke, a representative of Scotland Yard, after questioning everyone present, declares the death a suicide despite objection from Balfour's neighbour and close friend, Sir James Hamlin.

Five years later, the Hamlin residents witness strange lights within the now-forsaken Balfour mansion before realising the new tenants to be two vampiric figures of a man in a beaver-felt top hat with long hair and sharp teeth, and a silent pale woman wearing long robes. This prompts the baronet, Sir James, to call Burke in once again who discovers that Hamlin and the others there (Balfour's daughter, Lucille, his butler, Williams, and Hamlin's nephew, Arthur Hibbs) had been the only other persons in the Balfour home when he died. After noticing the new lease to the Balfour mansion bears the exact same signature as the deceased Roger Balfour's, Burke remains skeptical about the existence of the undead, and, along with Sir James, exhumes Roger Balfour's tomb to find it empty. After a series of grisly events; from the maid Miss Smithson's eccentric recollection of encountering the Man in the Beaver Hat manifesting in a bedroom, to the vampire girl flying down like a bat from the ceiling of the Balfour mansion, and witnessing the living corpse of Roger Balfour, Burke reveals to Lucille that he believes her father to have been murdered.

After taking the precaution to protect Lucille's bedroom from vampires, the girl is taken to the Balfour mansion. As Sir James is instructed to venture to the mansion, he encounters the Man in the Beaver Hat (revealed to be Burke) and is hypnotised into thinking it is five years
earlier. Within the mansion, the events leading up to Balfour's death are recreated and re-enacted and all secretly watch as Sir James kills Roger Balfour and fakes his suicide so as to ultimately marry Balfour's daughter Lucille, against the deceased's will. Once apprehended, Burke lifts the trance and identifies Sir James as the killer.

Cast
 Lon Chaney as Professor (or Inspector) Edward C. Burke / The Man in the Beaver Hat
 Marceline Day as Lucille Balfour
 Claude King as Roger Balfour / The Stranger
 Polly Moran as Miss Smithson, the New Maid
 Conrad Nagel as Arthur Hibbs
 Edna Tichenor as the Bat Girl
 Henry B. Walthall as Sir James Hamlin
 Percy Williams as Williams, Balfour's butler
 Andy MacLennan as Scotland Yard Inspector
 Jules Cowles as the Gardener
 Allan Cavan as the Estate Agent

Production notes
Lon Chaney's makeup for the film included sharpened teeth and the hypnotic eye effect, achieved with special wire fittings which he wore like monocles. Based on surviving accounts, he purposefully gave the "vampire" character an absurd quality, because it was the film's Scotland Yard detective character, also played by Chaney, in a disguise. Surviving stills show this was the only time Chaney used his famous makeup case as an on-screen prop.

The story was an original work by Tod Browning, with Waldemar Young, who had previously worked with Browning on The Unholy Three and The Unknown, as the scenario writer. Young was previously employed as a journalist in San Francisco, during which time he covered several famous murder investigations, a distinction which saw him lauded as knowing "mystery from actual experience."

In adding an authenticity to both Chaney's character and the atmosphere within the haunted house scenes, bats, armadillos, and owls were used.

When London After Midnight premiered at the Miller Theater in Missouri, set musicians Sam Feinburg and Jack Feinburg had to prepare melodies to go with the film's supernatural elements. The musicians used Ase's Todd and Eritoken by Greig, Dramatic Andante by Rappe, the Fire Music from Wagner's The Valkyrie along with other unlisted aspects of Savino, Zimonek and Puccini.

Reception
According to MGM records London After Midnight earned $721,000 in theater rentals from the United States and Canada and an additional $283,000 from foreign rentals, giving the studio a profit of $540,000. It became the most successful collaborative film between Chaney and Browning, but it received mixed reviews from critics. The storyline, called "somewhat incoherent" by The New York Times and "nonsensical" by Harrison's Reports, was a common point of criticism. "Mr. Chaney's makeup is at times hideous enough to make one sick in the stomach. It should please the morbid. Just like the last three or four pictures with this star --- gruesome!" (Nonetheless, the commercial success of London After Midnight saw Metro-Goldwyn-Mayer renew Tod Browning's directorial contract.)

A positive review ran in Film Daily, calling it "a story certain to disturb the nervous system of the more sensitive picture patrons. Thrills and weird doings in profusion. Probably a trifle too spooky for the timid soul. If they don't get the creeps from flashes of grimy bats swooping around, cobweb-bedecked mystery chambers and the grotesque inhabitants of the haunted house, then they've passed the third degree."

The Warren Tribune noted that Lon Chaney is "present in nearly every scene, in a dual role that tests his skill to no small degree." The review highlighted that this subdues Chaney's prominence and allows the plot to be better communicated, but it also causes the film to "not rank among his best productions."

A review by The Brooklyn Daily Eagle noted: "It is pleasant to report also that there is none of the usual stupid comedy relief in London After Midnight to mar its sinister and creepy scheme. That ought to make it the outstanding mystery film of the year." It however found fault in Tod Browning's direction because the film's atmosphere did not recapture "the intensely weird effect" found in The Cat and the Canary.

Variety wrote that "Young, Browning and Chaney have made a good combination in the past but the story on which this production is based is not of the quality that results in broken house records, adding that, since Burke was "a detached character, mechanical and wooden", he failed to meaningfully connect with the audience.... "It will add nothing to Chaney's prestige as a trouper, nor increase the star's box office value. With Chaney's name in lights, however, this picture, any picture with Chaney, means a strong box office draw."

"It is a somewhat incoherent narrative, which, however, gives Lon Chaney an opportunity to turn up in an uncanny disguise and also to manifest his powers as Scotland Yard's expert hypnotist. You are therefore treated to close-ups of Mr. Chaney's rolling orbs, which, fortunately, do not exert their influence on the audience." ---The New York Times

"There are moments during the onward sweep of this Metro-Goldwyn-Mayer offering when one feels that the essentials that make for mystery and creepiness have been carried a bit further than we have hitherto noted...Mr. Chaney's excellent work is materially aided by that grand master of screen acting, Mr. Walthall." ---Moving Picture World

The New Yorker also wrote that the "directing, acting and settings are all well up to the idea," but "it strives too hard to create effect. Mr. Browning can create pictorial terrors and Lon Chaney can get himself up in a completely repulsive manner, but both their efforts are wasted when the story makes no sense."

"Lon Chaney is back in a get-up which would make any sensitive girl quiver and quake on a dark night, but which doesn't require any contortions or self-torture. This is a dark, foul mystery play, which has certain elements as horrid as anyone could ask....you sit through it in a sort of daze." ---Motion Picture Magazine

"The disguise that (Chaney) uses while ferreting out the murderer is as gruesome as any he has ever worn....The suspense is marvelously sustained. Chaney plays a dual role, and when conventionally clad, is a little less convincing than usual. In the other role, perfect!" ---Photoplay

Remake
Tod Browning remade the film as a sound film in 1935. This film, called Mark of the Vampire, starred Lionel Barrymore and Bela Lugosi in the roles Lon Chaney had performed in London After Midnight.

Reconstructions and novelisations
A novelization of the film was written and published in 1928 by Marie Coolidge-Rask.

In 1985, Philip J. Riley published the first photo reconstruction of the film's plot compiled of all the surviving production stills at MGM.

In 2002, Turner Classic Movies commissioned restoration producer Rick Schmidlin to produce a 45-minute reconstruction of the film, using the same still photographs. with added camera motion. This was released as a part of The Lon Chaney Collection DVD set released by the TCM Archives.

In 2016, Thomas Mann published the book, London After Midnight: A New Reconstruction Based on Contemporary Sources, upon the discovery of a previously-unknown 11,000-word Boy's Cinema magazine published in 1928. A second edition was published in 2018 upon the discovery of an alternative French novelization for the film.

In 2022, a new study by independent historian Daniel Titley, titled London After Midnight: The Lost Film, was released in conjunction with the film’s 95th anniversary, in which nitrate elements from the lost film itself were presented for the first time, along with many other new insights published by Keyreads, and serving as the most milestone discovery of the film to-date.

Theatrical poster
In 2014, the only contemporary poster known to exist for the film was sold in Dallas, Texas, to an anonymous bidder for $478,000, making it the most valuable movie poster ever sold at public auction. This bidder was later revealed to be Metallica guitarist Kirk Hammett. The poster is in his displayed collection at the Royal Ontario Museum in Toronto. (The 1932 film The Mummy held the previous record for a poster's sale at public auction, selling for more than $453,000 in 1997.)

In popular culture
 Batman co-creator Bob Kane recalled in 1992 during a discussion with Stan Lee of the Penguin for Batman Returns that the character bore a striking resemblance to "Lon Chaney in London After Midnight; I don't know if you ever saw that silent movie..."
 Director Jennifer Kent has stated that images of Lon Chaney's character inspired the look of the titular character in The Babadook.
 In 2012, episodes 5 and 6 of Whitechapel featured a killer obsessed with London After Midnight who owned a surviving copy.
 The theatrical poster for the 2021 horror film The Black Phone has been compared to Chaney.

See also

List of lost films
Lon Chaney
Silent films
Vampire film

References

Further reading
 Everson, William K. (1974). Classics of the Horror Film. Citadel Press. 
 Jacobs, Louis B. "Plastic Dentistry: New Hollywood Art," Photoplay, October 1928. Features London After Midnight.
 Melton, J. Gordon (2011). The Vampire Book: The Encyclopedia of the Undead. Visible Ink Press. 
 Riley, Philip J. (2011). London After Midnight – a Reconstruction. Bear Manor Media. 
 Soister, John; Nicolella, Henry (2012). American Silent Horror, Science Fiction and Fantasy Feature Films, 1913–1929. British Library.

External links

Spanish-language poster for London After Midnight
Synopsis of London After Midnight at lonchaney.org
 Rumor Spreading That Long-Lost London After Midnight Has Been Found at Bloody Disgusting

1920s English-language films
1927 horror films
1920s mystery films
1920s psychological thriller films
1927 films
1927 lost films
American black-and-white films
American haunted house films
American horror films
American mystery films
American silent feature films
Films based on short fiction
Films directed by Tod Browning
Films about hypnosis
Films produced by Irving Thalberg
Films set in country houses
Films set in London
Films set in the 1920s
Lost American films
Lost horror films
Lost mystery films
Metro-Goldwyn-Mayer films
1920s American films
Silent mystery films
Silent thriller films
Silent horror films